Robert Bentley Todd (9 April 1809 – 30 January 1860) was an Irish-born physician who is best known for describing the condition postictal paralysis in his Lumleian Lectures in 1849 now known as Todd's palsy.

Early life 
The son of physician Charles Hawkes Todd (1784–1826) and Elizabeth Bentley (1783–1862), Robert was born in Dublin, Ireland, 9 April 1809.  He was the younger brother of noted writer and minister Rev. James Henthorn Todd, D.D. He is the older brother of Rev. William Gowan Todd, D.D. and Armstrong Todd, MD.

Robert attended day school and was tutored by the Rev. William Higgin (1793–1867), who later became bishop of the Diocese of Derry and Raphoe.

Todd entered Trinity College, Dublin in 1825, intending to study for the bar. When his father died the next year, he switched to medicine and became a resident pupil at a hospital in Dublin. He was a student of Robert Graves, and graduated B.A. at Trinity in 1829. He became licensed at the Royal College of Surgeons in Ireland two years later.

At Hassel by Hull, Yorkshire, Robert Bentley Todd married Elizabeth Mary née Hart (1814–1894) 20 December 1836. The younger sister of Capt. John Hart M.P. (1808–1873) [Australian Dictionary of Biography], Elizabeth was baptized at St John's, Hackney, the daughter of journalist John Harriot Hart and Mary née Glanville on 23 June 1814.  In one of the most sensational cases of its day, John Herriot Hart co-owner The Whig Independent newspaper was imprisoned in Gloucester Gaol for liable [Annual Register vol 72 p. 74], before being transported to Tenerife. It is presumed that he died on the return voyage to England.

Elizabeth is not the only member of the Hart family to marry into the Todd family. Robert's younger sister, Margaret Gillmor Todd (1817–1876), married Elizabeth's brother, Capt. John Hart, a Premier of South Australia.

The children of Robert Bentley Todd and Elizabeth née Hart; were 

 Elizabeth Marion Todd (1841–1917), unmarried,
 Alice Margaret Todd (1843–1916), unmarried,
 Bertha [Todd] Johnson (1846–1927), Principal of St Anne's College, University of Oxford, and 
 James Henthorn Todd (1848–1891), unmarried; died near Bombay, India, 14 August 1891.

Professional life 

He then moved to London, where he practised medicine and lectured. He received a M.S. at Pembroke College, Oxford in 1832, a B.M. the following year, and a D.M. in 1836. He traveled widely in Europe, lecturing and becoming acquainted with a number of eminent men in his field. He took the license of the Royal College of Physicians in 1833, became a Fellow in 1837, and a Censor in 1839–1840. He was made a Fellow of the Royal Society and served on the council in 1838–1839. In 1836–1837 he served on a sub-committee of the British Association to inquire into the motions of the heart, and in 1839–1840 was Examiner for the University of London. In 1844 he was elected Fellow of the Royal College of Surgeons.

Todd's abiding interests were in physiological medicine (a field then in its infancy) and in the improvement of hospital nursing, and always held to a high standard of general and religious knowledge. He became a Professor at King's College London in 1836 and was prominent in the opening of King's College Hospital in 1840, and in the founding of its new building in 1851. It was largely through his advocacy that the Sisters of St John's commenced nursing at King's College Hospital.

Todd's increasing practice forced him to resign his professorship in 1853, and in the final years of his life his practice grew enormously. In failing health, he was finally forced to give up his clinical lectures at the hospital that he had helped found.

Robert Bentley Todd died in his consulting rooms at his home located at 26 Brook Street, Grosvenor Square, Westminster, on 30 January 1860. He died of a gastrointestinal hemorrhage.  He was buried at All Souls, Kensal Green, 4 February 1860. 

A statue of Todd was erected in the great hall of King's College Hospital.

Legacy 
Todd was the first to lay down definite principles for the treatment of serious cases of fever. In his Lumleian lectures he discussed the nature and treatment of various forms of delirium, and showed the significant role that exhaustion played in patient deterioration, and how bleeding and lowering remedies contributed to deterioration, while supporting treatment was followed by relief.

Todd was a prolific contributor to medical publications, including The Cyclopaedia of Anatomy and Physiology. He immediately integrated newly available technology, particularly the microscope, into the study and practice of medicine, and was a driving force in raising the standards of medical knowledge.

Todd is remembered for his prescription of a hot drink of brandy, canella (white cinnamon), sugar syrup and water. This is called a Hot toddy.

Partial bibliography 
Among Todd's publications were
 The Cyclopaedia of Anatomy and Physiology (1835–1859, with other notables)
 Gulstonian Lectures on the Physiology of the Stomach (1839)
 Physiological Anatomy and Physiology of Man (1843–1856, with W. Bowman) — this was among the first works in which histology played an important role (Philadelphia 1857 edition)
 Practical Remarks on Gout, Rheumatic Fever, and Chronic Rheumatism of the Joints (1843) (Croonian Lecture 1843)
 Description and Physiological Anatomy of the Brain, Spinal Cord, and Ganglions (1845)
 Lumleian Lectures on the Pathology and Treatment of Delirium and Coma (1850)
 Clinical Lectures (1854–1857–1859, in three volumes)
 Contributions to the Transactions of the Royal Medical and Chirurgical Society from 1833 through 1859 ('chirurgical' is an obsolete term meaning 'surgical')
 Ten articles to the Cyclopaedia of Medicine from 1833 to 1835, including discussions of paralysis, pseudo-morbid appearances, suppuration, and diseases of the spinal marrow

References

Citations

External links 

 
 Todd, Robert Bentley, The Cyclopaedia of Anatomy and Physiology (1836–1852) as fullscan from the original or from Google Books Search (1859).
 
 
 

  available for full download

  available for full download

  available for full download

  available for full download
 

1809 births
1860 deaths
19th-century Irish medical doctors
Academics of King's College London
Alumni of Pembroke College, Oxford
Burials at Kensal Green Cemetery
Fellows of King's College London
Irish physiologists
Irish Anglicans
People from County Dublin
Fellows of the Royal College of Surgeons
Fellows of the Royal College of Physicians
Fellows of the Royal Society